Metzgeria is a genus of thalloid liverworts in the family Metzgeriaceae.

Taxonomy
The genus was named in honor of Johann Metzger (1771–1844), a German copper engraver and art restorer from Staufen im Breisgau, in Baden-Württemberg, a friend of Giuseppe Raddi and pupil of the great Florentine engraver Raffaello Sanzio Morghen (1753–1833).

Species
Approximately 120 to 200 species of Metzgeria have been described.  Species may be either monoicous or dioicous. Species include the following:
 Metzgeria angusta
 Metzgeria atrichoneura
 Metzgeria conjugata
 Metzgeria crassipilis
 Metzgeria furcata
 Metzgeria leptoneura
 Metzgeria myriopoda
 Metzgeria pubescens
 Metzgeria submarginata
 Metzgeria temperata
 Metzgeria uncigera

References

Literature
RADDI G. 1818. Jungermanniografia Etrusca. Memorie i Mathematica e di Fisica della Societa Italiana delle Scienze (Modena), 18: 14–56, plus tables.
Meagher, David (University of Melbourne Department of Botany), pers. comm.

External links 

Metzgeriales
Liverwort genera